St Pancras Cruising Club (SPCC) is a members' association of boat owners located between Camden Town and Islington on the Regent's Canal in central London. Most boats in the basin are narrowboats, the most common form of craft on the British canals.  As the club is near to King's Cross station, it is affected by the ongoing developments at King's Cross Central, formerly known as the Railway Lands.

Location and facilities
St Pancras Cruising Club is based at the basin of the same name, next to Camley Street Natural Park, between St Pancras Station and St Pancras Old Church, one of the oldest church buildings in London, hence the name of the district. The club, which was founded in 1958, is situated in a canal basin that was used to handle building stone.

SPCC has a clubhouse with a bar.  It constructed the first new dry dock in London for many decades, now the only one in the capital.  In 2001 the club became the guardian of a listed water tower, originally used to refill the steam locomotives.  The Victorian Gothic brick structure, designed by the office of Sir George Gilbert Scott around 1870, was moved a few hundred metres to save it from the path of the Eurostar high-speed rail link from the Channel Tunnel.

Activities
SPCC has gained a reputation as one of the country's foremost cruising clubs, based not least on the year-round safe navigations that it conducts and marshals on the Tideway, the tidal Thames.  Notable cruises include the 2007 one to the Houses of Parliament protesting DEFRA cuts to the inland waterways budget  It was also a pivotal organiser in the narrowboat contribution to the Thames Diamond Jubilee Pageant in 2012.

SPCC has always played an active part in waterways events. It is a founder member of the Association of Waterways Cruising Clubs, of which the current chairman, David Pearce, served for seven years as the commodore of SPCC. The club helps organise events such as the Angel Canal Festival  and the Canalway Cavalcade, in which the boat handling competition novice winner's trophy is named after a former commodore of SPCC, Dr Roger Squires.

See also

Canals of the United Kingdom
History of the British canal system
Waterway society

References

External links
Club website

Clubs and societies in London
Transport in the London Borough of Camden
Waterways organisations in England